The Ancient Wisdom is a book by Annie Besant published in 1897, as per the dedication in the leader of the undated first pressing.

In this book, Besant introduces and explains the Physical plane, Astral plane, Mental plane and other planes of existence.

George Farthing has criticized the book, because Besant has introduced new terms like "Etheric body" into the theosophical literature, which were not used by Blavatsky or the theosophical Mahatmas.

See also
https://en.wikiquote.org/wiki/Annie_Besant#The_Ancient_Wisdom_(1897)

External links 
 The Ancient Wisdom (1918) - book
George Farthing's criticism
Theosophy vs Neo-Theosophy - Principles of Man
Theosophy vs Neo-Theosophy - Atma
Theosophy vs Neo-Theosophy - Teaching on Lower Kingdoms Vs. "Group Souls"
Theosophy vs Neo-Theosophy - Causal Body

Theosophical texts
1897 books